The Rural Municipality of Mossey River is a rural municipality in the Parkland Region of Manitoba, Canada, located at the south end of Lake Winnipegosis.

It is named for the Mossey River, a river that flows through the municipality.

History
The Rural Municipality of Mossey River was incorporated on May 1, 1906. On January 1, 2015, it amalgamated with the Village of Winnipegosis as dictated by The Municipal Amalgamations Act, which required that municipalities with a population less than 1,000 amalgamate with one or more neighbouring municipalities by 2015. The Government of Manitoba initiated these amalgamations in order for municipalities to meet the 1997 minimum population requirement of 1,000 to incorporate a municipality.

Communities 
 Fork River
 Oak Brae
 Volga
 Winnipegosis

Demographics 

References

External links 

 

Rural municipalities in Manitoba
2015 establishments in Manitoba
Manitoba municipal amalgamations, 2015
Populated places disestablished in 2015
2015 disestablishments in Manitoba
Populated places established in 1906